French May Arts Festival (藝術節) is an annual arts festival organized by the Association Culturelle France - Hong Kong Limited to promote French art and culture. Events include visual arts, operas, classical and contemporary dance, music and theatre, circus as well as cinema.

Exhibitions 
 Chu The-Chun - University Museum and Art Gallery, Hong Kong (2010)
 Bettina Rheims, Rose, c’est Paris - Hong Kong City Hall (2011)
 Guillaume Bottazzi, Guillaume Bottazzi, wonderland - Hong Kong Central Library (2016)

References

Consulate General of France in Hong Kong and Macau: https://hongkong.consulfrance.org/Guillaume-Bottazzi-Wonderland-Le-French-May-2016-10059
Hong Kong Tourism Board: http://www.discoverhongkong.com/eng/see-do/arts-performance/highlight-events/le-french-may-arts-festival.jsp
Consulate General of France in Hong Kong and Macau: http://www.consulfrance-hongkong.org/LE-FRENCH-MAY-2013-PREVIEW-DINNER
Hong Kong Tatler: http://hk.asiatatler.com/events/le-french-may-2013-preview-dinner
Hong Kong Tatler: http://hk.asiatatler.com/columnists/joanne-chan/horseracing-in-hong-kong-and-france
Hong Kong Tatler: http://hk.asiatatler.com/columnists/joanne-chan/le-french-may-highlight
SCMP: http://www.scmp.com/lifestyle/article/1104667/le-french-may-gets-flying-start-2013
LCSD (2011), Le French May Arts Festival 2011: https://archive.today/20130217165524/http://sc.lcsd.gov.hk/gb/www.lcsd.gov.hk/CE/CulturalService/Programme/en/music/00000290.html
LCSD (2012), Le French May Arts Festival 2012: https://archive.today/20130217154541/http://sc.lcsd.gov.hk/b5/www.lcsd.gov.hk/CE/CulturalService/Programme/en/multi_arts/000003a5.html
HK Government (2012), Hong Kong Heritage Museum to exhibit Picasso masterpieces: http://www.info.gov.hk/gia/general/201203/28/P201203280518.htm
Alliance Francaise (2003), French May 2003 : un avant-goût: 
French Chamber of Commerce and Industry in Hong Kong (2009), A heartfelt tribute to Laurent Aublin (1949-2009): https://web.archive.org/web/20141111113549/http://www.fccihk.com/fccihk/en/news/news_details.html?id=377

External links

Festivals in Hong Kong
Culture of Macau
Arts festivals in China
Cultural festivals in China